Sex Change Hospital is an American documentary-style reality television series about 12 transgender people who have sex reassignment surgery at the Mt. San Rafael Hospital in Trinidad, Colorado, under the care of OB/GYN Marci Bowers. The patients talk about their lives and viewers follow them through their consultations with Bowers, the surgical procedures, and their post-surgical experience.

Sex Change Hospital was produced by World of Wonder, and premiered in the United Kingdom on More4 in May 2007. In June, a 47-minute excerpt screened at the 31st Frameline Film Festival in San Francisco. After the series aired on US specialty channel WE tv in 2008, it was nominated for a GLAAD Media Award for Outstanding Documentary. Discovery Health rebroadcast the series in the US in 2009, and again in 2011 when it relaunched as Discovery Fit & Health.

Bowers was the subject of the 2008 documentary Trinidad; she and her practice also feature in the final episode of TransGeneration, a documentary-style reality series that aired in 2005.

Overview
Dr. Marci Bowers is a gynecologist and obstetrician at the Mt. San Rafael Hospital in Trinidad, Colorado. She is also a surgeon who specializes in gender confirmation surgeries, and she herself is transgender. Over the course of six episodes, 12 transgender people visit Bowers for surgery.

In each episode, two new patients of Bowers describe something of their family lives, their experiences as transgender people, and their feelings about the past and this new phase of their transition. When they arrive at the hospital, the doctor talks with them about the procedure and their needs. In the operating room, Bowers' explanations of different aspects of the procedure are interspersed with conversation amongst the surgical team. After surgery, once the patient is ready, Bowers visits them in their room, where they chat and talk about the surgical outcome and aftercare.

Episodes

Production and broadcast
Sex Change Hospital was produced by World of Wonder, a company that had previously produced the 2005 docusoap TransGeneration (in which Bowers briefly appears). After Sex Change Hospital, World of Wonder produced a reality dating game show called Transamerican Love Story (2008). One of Bowers' patients, Jim Howley, was cast a contestant in the show.

Although World of Wonder is an American production company, the television premiere of Sex Change Hospital was on a British digital television channel, More4, where it aired from May to June 2007. Stateside, a 47-minute excerpt screened at the 31st Frameline Film Festival in San Francisco on 14 June. The television premiere in the US was on WE tv (a specialty channel marketed to women) where it aired from October to November 2008. Another speciality channel, Discovery Health, rebroadcast the series in the US from February to March 2009, and again in 2011 when it relaunched as Discovery Fit & Health.

Reception
"While it's great that such documentaries… are making it easier to understand people who might have led completely tormented secret lives in previous generations," wrote Andrea Mullaney of The Scotsman, "focusing purely on personal stories doesn't really open up the issues behind this extraordinary development in modern times.… while their stories evoked sympathy, I wonder why no one ever asks why our gender roles have become so codified that their only option was such drastic surgery."

David Hinckley of the New York Daily News expected that the show would present some viewers with "high hurdles": transgender themes and graphic footage of surgery. "On the other hand", he adds, "the human part of the story—the things that patients and the people in their lives go through—provides familiar dramas about conflict, doubt and reconciliation. Often touching, those stories can resonate with everyone."

After the series aired in the US in 2008, it was nominated for the GLAAD Media Award for Outstanding Documentary. The award went to Parvez Sharma's A Jihad for Love, a feature-length documentary about LGBT Muslims living in different countries.

See also

 Transitioning (transgender)
 Sex reassignment surgery (female-to-male)
 Sex reassignment surgery (male-to-female)
 Hormone replacement therapy (female-to-male)
 Hormone replacement therapy (male-to-female)

References

Further reading

External links
 Sex Change Hospital at Channel 4 
 Sex Change Hospital at WE tv 
 Sex Change Hospital at World of Wonder 
 Sex Change Hospital at Frameline
 

2007 British television series debuts
2007 British television series endings
2000s LGBT-related reality television series
2000s American reality television series
English-language television shows
Transgender-related television shows
American LGBT-related reality television series